The Rowans is the second album by country rock brothers Chris and Lorin Rowan billed this time as The Rowans and joined by their brother Peter Rowan. The standout tracks are "Midnight-Moonlight", "Thunder on the Mountain", and "Beggar in Blue Jeans".

Track listing
"Take It as It Comes"  (Lorin Rowan) – 3:22
"Midnight-Moonlight"  (Peter Rowan) – 4:19
"Me Loving You"  (Chris Rowan) – 4:04
"Old Silver"  (Peter Rowan) – 3:02
"Thunder on the Mountain"  (Peter Rowan) – 8:25
"Beggar in Blue Jeans"  (Chris Rowan) – 4:56
"Do Right"  (Lorin Rowan) – 4:15
"Man-Woman"  (Chris Rowan) – 5:44
"Pieces on the Ground"  (Lorin Rowan) – 3:54
"Here Today, Gone Tomorrow"  (Peter Rowan) – 3:42

Personnel
Peter Rowan – electric guitar, acoustic guitar, mandolin, mandola, mandocello, tabla, tamboura, vocals
Chris Rowan – acoustic guitar, electric guitar, flute, keyboards, vocals
Lorin Rowan – acoustic guitar, electric guitar, piano, sound effects, vocals
David Hayes – bass
Russ Kunkel – drums
Jack Bonus – flute, saxophone

Production
Producer: The Rowans/Gordon Anderson/Joe Carroll/Richard Podolor
Recording Engineer: Bill Cooper
Mixing: Bill Cooper
Mastering: Doug Sax
Photography/Design: Norman Seeff

The Rowans albums
1975 albums
Albums produced by Richard Podolor
Asylum Records albums